The following lists events that happened during 1897 in Australia.

Incumbents

Premiers
Premier of New South Wales - George Reid
Premier of South Australia - Charles Kingston
Premier of Queensland - Hugh Nelson
Premier of Tasmania - Edward Braddon
Premier of Western Australia - John Forrest
Premier of Victoria - George Turner

Governors
Governor of New South Wales – Henry Brand, 2nd Viscount Hampden
Governor of Queensland – Charles Cochrane-Baillie, 2nd Baron Lamington
Governor of South Australia – Sir Thomas Buxton, 3rd Baronet
Governor of Tasmania – Jenico Preston, 14th Viscount Gormanston
Governor of Victoria – Thomas Brassey, 1st Earl Brassey
Governor of Western Australia – Gerard Smith

Events
 7 January - Darwin has its highest ever daily rainfall with 296.1 millimetres from its most severe cyclone until Tracy.
 22 June - The second Victoria Bridge is opened in Brisbane by the Governor of Queensland, Lord Lamington. The previous bridge was destroyed by floodwaters
 27 October - St Patrick's Cathedral, Melbourne is consecrated

Arts and literature

 Walter Withers wins the inaugural Wynne Prize for landscape painting or figure sculpture for his landscape The Storm

Queensland Braille Writing Association was formed in Brisbane - later became Braille House

Sport
 4 September - Essendon wins the first Victorian Football League premiership.
 8 October - The Australasian Athletic Union is established in Sydney.
 Gaulus wins the Melbourne Cup
 New South Wales wins the Sheffield Shield

Births
 10 February - Judith Anderson (died 1992), actress
 6 July - Frank Walsh (died 1968), Premier of South Australia
 9 July - Enid Lyons (died 1981), politician
 28 July - James Fairbairn (died 1940), politician
 6 August - William Slim (died 1970), Governor General of Australia
 5 October - Percy Spender (died 1985), politician and diplomat
 7 October - Charles Chauvel (died 1959), film maker

Deaths
 11 June - Henry Ayers (born 1821), Premier of South Australia
 11 July - Patrick Jennings (born 1831), Premier of New South Wales
 15 August - Lily Poulett-Harris (born 1873), founder of women's cricket in Australia
 15 November - Alfred Kennerley (born 1810), Premier of Tasmania
 20 November - Ernest Giles (born 1835), explorer

References

 
Australia
Years of the 19th century in Australia